Maja Hirsch (born in 1977 in Warsaw) is a Polish actress.

Biography 
She was born to Russian mother and Polish father with German roots.

Hirsch graduated from Aleksander Zelwerowicz State Theatre Academy in Warsaw. She debuted during her studies, in 1998 at the Studio Teatralne KOŁO. Since 2000 Maja Hirsch has been connected with the Gustaw Holoubek State Drama Theatre in Warsaw, and she also performed at the Syrena Theatre in 2005.

Filmography 
 2000 - Dom
 2000 - Lokatorzy as Jacek's girlfriend
 2000 - Zaduszki narodowe as herself
 2001-2010 - M jak miłość as Iza
 2003 - Ciało as sister Morrison
 2003 - Czarno to widzę as Zofia
 2003 - Kasia i Tomek as lesbian girl
 2003 - Miodowe lata
 2003 - Spotkania
 2004 - Bulionerzy as policeman
 2004 - Zakręcone as Adam
 2006 - Pogoda na piątek as Ada Kaczmarczyk
 2007 - Świadek koronny as Iza
 2007 - Prawo miasta as Mutra
 2008-2009 - BrzydUla as Paulina Febo
 2009 - Apetyt na życie as Julia Mikas
 2010 - Ojciec Mateusz as Agata
 2011 - Jak się pozbyć cellulitu as Maja Minorska
 2011 - Ki as Kaja
 2011 - Wiadomości z drugiej ręki as Magda Szwed
 2011 - Wszyscy kochają Romana as Nina Serafin
 2012 - Prawo Agaty as Justyna Nałęcz
 2012 - Na krawędzi as Tamara Madejska
 2014 - Komisarz Alex as Wanda Gandecka
 2014 - Na krawędzi 2 as Tamara Madejska
 2015 - Ojciec Mateusz as Bożena Dembińska
 2016 - Bodo as Barbara Drewiczówna
 2017 - DJ as Maja
 2017 - O mnie się nie martw as Wanda Izdebska
 2018 - Trzecia połowa as Adela
 2019 - Zakochani po uszy as Elwira Witos, matka Sylwii

References 

1977 births
Polish actresses
Polish people of Russian descent
Polish people of German descent
Living people